Orissus or Orisson (floruit 3rd century BC) was a chief, leader or ruler of the Iberian Oretani.

Biography 
In his first appearance in historical chronicles, Orissus came to the aid of the city of Heliké (whose location is unknown), which had been besieged by Hamilcar Barca's Carthaginians in 228 BC. It is unknown if he had lived through the disasters of previous Hispanic leaders, such as those of the brothers Istolatios and Indortes, but it seems undeniable that he faced the Carthaginian troops with more cunning than they. Gathering a strong army from the towns in the area, Orissus arrived pretending to seek an alliance with Hamilcar to help him subdue the besieged, but as soon as the Punics lowered their guard, he attacked them with all his might, managing to dismantle the siege and put them to flight. This would be the first defeat of Carthage in Hispania.

It is said that the Carthaginians tried to use their fearsome war elephants in battle, but Orissus had warned against them by hiding behind his army a herd of fighting bulls with torches on their antlers. When the elephants came out, the Oretani lit their torches and spurred the bulls against them, scaring off the Punic beasts and causing chaos in their lines, as well as setting their camp on fire. In this episode, not all historians agree: Diodorus Siculus maintains it as it is related, while Polybius and Appian do not detail it and only emphasize that Orissus won through deception, and Frontinus and Zonaras believe that loaded chariots were used of burning branches instead of torches on the horns.

Hamilcar's death is also usually placed in this same battle, which is not exempt from deep disagreements either. Diodorus and Appian believe that the Carthaginian general drowned in a river after falling from his horse while being pursued by Oretani; Frontinus claims that Hamilcar survived the current, though only to be cut down moments later by warriors from Helike; Zonaras picks up that he fell into his camp trying to run away from the chaos of the elephants; and Polybius, finally, posits that Hamilcar fell against an Iberian tribe, but does not specify whether he is referring to this episode or whether the Punic managed to escape the battle alive to die at a later time.

The following year (227 BC), Orissus was defeated by Hamilcar's son-in-law, Hasdrubal the Fair, who returned to the conquest with 50,000 men, 6,000 horsemen and 200 elephants as reinforcements. Orison was probably executed then, since those responsible for Hamilcar's death are said to have been punished, and the twelve cities under whose command he was handed over to the Punics.

Sources 

 Antonio Alburquerque Pérez, Indortes e Istolacio, Orisón, Indíbil y Mandonio, 1988.

References 

3rd-century BC rulers in Europe
220s deaths